Red Rock is a brand of ginger ale and cola. The Red Rock Company was among the oldest producers of carbonated beverages in the United States.

History
The Red Rock Company was founded in 1885 by Lee Hagan and G. T. Dodd of Atlanta, Georgia. Dodd initially introduced ginger ale as the company's first product, which became popular in the Southern U.S. By 1938, Red Rock was an early leader in the distribution of carbonated beverages, distributing 12-ounce bottles by way of a distribution network of 200 bottlers. By 1947, Red Rock products were bottled in 45 of the 48 U.S. states, but by 1958, the company's success began to decline.

Red Rock Cola was endorsed by famous baseball player Babe Ruth. Posters of his endorsement were printed in 1939.

Red Rock today
After the 1950s, the Red Rock Company seemed to vanish entirely and it is unknown when the company disestablished. An orphaned affiliate continued producing the product in the Dominican Republic, and it is now distributed there by the Cervecería Nacional Dominicana. The formulas for Red Rock's carbonated beverage products survive and are now owned by Sensient Technologies of Indianapolis, Indiana, which has its own network of distributors. Clayton Distributors of Atlanta is a major distributor of Red Rock branded ginger ale and cola.

External links
CokeGirl's Soda TraderZ page - Red Rock Cola
Sensient Technologies website
Atlanta Business Journal - "Gingerly stepping by soda giant" - July 24, 1998

American cola brands
Ginger ale